The Shepperton Henge is a former henge monument in the village of Shepperton in the south-eastern English county of Surrey. Constructed around 3500 BCE, during Britain's Late Neolithic period, it was rediscovered by archaeologists in 1989.

Further reading
Phil Jones, A Neolithic Ringditch and Later Prehistoric Features at Staines Road Farm, Shepperton
Gibson, A. (2012). An Introduction to the Study of Henges: Time for a Change? In: Gibson, A. (ed.). Enclosing the Neolithic: Recent studies in Britain and Europe. Oxford: Archaeopress. BAR International Series 2440, pp. 1-20

External links
Shepperton Henge at The Megalithic Portal
Shepperton Henge at Exploring Surrey's Past

Archaeological sites in Surrey
Buildings and structures in Surrey